The Struggle Continues may refer to:
 The Struggle Continues (Looptroop album), 2002
 The Struggle Continues (Dewey Redman album), 1982
 The Struggle Continues (Link 80 album), 2000
 The Struggle Continues (Yung Child Support album), 2017

See also
 Lotta Continua